The Ohio Speedskating Tour was the oldest continually running roller-skating racing state league in the United States.  It is also known as the Ohio Buckeye Speed League. It is sanctioned by USA Roller Sports.

External links
http://www.ohiospeedskatingtour.com

Roller skating competitions
Roller skating in the United States